Childstown Township is a township in Turner County, South Dakota, United States. As of the 2010 census, its population was 237.

It is the location of the Childstown Township Bridge Number S-15, 282nd St., Childstown, SD (Turner County Highway Superintendent), which is listed on the National Register of Historic Places.

References

Townships in Turner County, South Dakota
Townships in South Dakota